Peckin' Time is an album credited to saxophonist Hank Mobley and trumpeter Lee Morgan recorded by the Blue Note label on February 9, 1958 and first released as BLP 1574 (mono). It features the two playing in a quintet rounded out by pianist Wynton Kelly, bassist Paul Chambers, and drummer Charlie Persip.

Reception
The Allmusic review by Steve Leggett stated: "It all adds up to a fine program, and if Mobley didn't push the envelope a whole lot, his lyrical and economical playing was always appropriate and graceful, and that's certainly the case here."

Track listing 
All compositions by Hank Mobley except as indicated
 "High and Flighty" – 6:09
 "Speak Low" (Kurt Weill, Ogden Nash) – 7:12
 "Peckin' Time" – 6:52
 "Stretchin' Out" – 9:04
 "Git-Go Blues" – 12:25

Bonus tracks on CD:
"High and Flighty" [Alternate Take] – 6:35
 "Speak Low" [Alternate Take] – 7:13
 "Stretchin' Out" [Alternate Take] – 6:46

Personnel 
 Hank Mobley – tenor saxophone
 Lee Morgan – trumpet
 Wynton Kelly – piano
 Paul Chambers – bass
 Charlie Persip – drums

References 

1959 albums
Albums produced by Alfred Lion
Albums recorded at Van Gelder Studio
Blue Note Records albums
Hank Mobley albums
Hard bop albums
Lee Morgan albums